WIN Television is an Australian television network owned by WIN Corporation that is based in Wollongong, New South Wales. WIN commenced transmissions on 18 March 1962 as a single television station covering the Wollongong region. The WIN Network has since grown to cover much of regional Australia. The network's name, WIN, originates from its first station, Wollongong's WIN-4. WIN has a program supply agreement with metropolitan broadcaster Nine Network, covering its stations in Regional Queensland, Southern and Western New South Wales, Griffith, Regional Victoria, Mildura, Tasmania, Eastern South Australia, and Regional Western Australia. WIN also has a program supply agreement with third-placed metropolitan broadcaster Network 10, for its Northern New South Wales station. WIN also produces and broadcasts weeknight half-hour local news bulletins across its Queensland, southern New South Wales, Victoria and Tasmania markets, as WIN News.

Regional services
Through its many television broadcast licences, WIN re-broadcasts metropolitan network content into regional Australian markets, as follows:

History

Early years in Wollongong

Television Wollongong Transmission Limited (TWT) was incorporated on 4 October 1955 by a group of local businessmen. Five years later, it was awarded a licence by the Postmaster-General's Department, over a number of other groups aligned to Sydney-based stations ATN-7 and TCN-9, to broadcast to the Illawarra and South Coast regions. The new station was to broadcast on the VHF-4 frequency, using the callsign WIN (which stood for Wollongong Illawarra New South Wales, in line with other Australian call signs). Soon after, a plot of land was purchased at Fort Drummond, approximately two kilometres south of the Wollongong central business district, for the station's television studios.

Prior to the opening night's transmissions, WIN-4 undertook a television conversion program, aimed at encouraging residents to acquire new tuning equipment and converting television sets in the area to receive the station's allocated frequency. A transmitter was to be erected on Knight's Hill; however, test transmissions were delayed due to rain.

WIN-4 commenced transmissions at 5:15 p.m. on 18 March 1962. The first night was met with a number of technical issues, most notably the complete loss of audio. TCN-9 and ATN-7 refused to sell programming to the station, leading to an unstable financial situation which, at its peak, left the station with only 42 hours of programming.

In April 1963, Media Securities, owned by Rupert Murdoch, acquired a controlling interest in the station (his second television station after NWS-9 Adelaide) and soon appointed a new general manager, Bill Lean. Both TCN-9 and ATN-7 began purchasing several hours of first-run American television programming from WIN-4, following contractual arrangements signed by Murdoch. Throughout this period, WIN-4 expanded its repeater transmissions to include Moruya, Batemans Bay, Narooma, Bega and Eden. Local programming and the station's near-monopoly in the area meant that, by 1973, viewership had increased to occupy 63 percent of the audience.

In order to buy controlling interests in capital city stations TEN-10 Sydney and ATV-0 (now ATV-10) Melbourne, in June 1979, Murdoch sold his 76 per cent stake in the publicly listed Wollongong station to Oberon Broadcasters, owned by the head of Paramount Pictures' international distribution arm, Bruce Gordon. At the time, under the Broadcasting and Television Act, a company was not permitted to own more than 5 per cent in more than one television station in the same state.

Since inception in 1962, the network has produced and broadcast notable programs including Sportsview and Sportsworld, a review of international, national and local sporting events. From the first week of transmissions, children's television series The Channel 4 Club was produced, with children's television program Stopwatch beginning in 1979. English-language educational programme You Say the Word began in 1971, catering to non-English-speaking immigrants. Long-running entertainment program Variety Italian Style premiered in 1974, with Malcom Elliott initially hosting the short-lived Tonight Show in 1981 being replaced by John Tingle a year later. To commemorate WIN Television's 21st year of broadcasting, a one-and-half-hour retrospective montage special was produced in 1983. WIN Television also co-produced telemovie Last Chance in 1986 with a Canadian television production company.

1980–1999: Aggregation and expansion

During this period, WIN expanded through the purchase of stations in Victoria, Queensland, and New South Wales. In 1984, WIN became the first regional television station to transmit in stereophonic sound. Close links between WIN Television and the Nine Network ensured it the Nine Network affiliation for southern New South Wales when aggregation occurred in March 1989. The changes meant that WIN expanded into the rest of southern New South Wales, launching new stations in Canberra, Orange, Bathurst, Dubbo and Wagga Wagga, with new buildings and studios built in Orange, Wagga and Canberra. Aggregation also provided the network with two additional competitors, The Prime Network and Capital Television.

In 1990, WIN purchased Queensland station Star TV, with stations in Rockhampton (RTQ) and the Darling Downs (DDQ and SDQ), just weeks before aggregation was to occur in regional Queensland. The station had already been set to become a Network Ten affiliate under its previous owners, however WIN's links with the Nine Network enabled it to clinch Nine Network affiliation away from QTV, which was then forced to affiliate with third-placed Network Ten, with just days to go.

ENT Limited, a Launceston-based company that owned a number of television and radio stations in regional Victoria and Tasmania, was taken over by WIN in 1994. Television Victoria and TasTV were, as a result, rebranded as WIN Television. The network further expanded to Griffith in 1998, when WIN purchased MTN-9 Griffith and its supplementary station AMN-31 from its local owners. As MTN had been affiliated with WIN since the early 1990s, the station was easily integrated into the network.

WIN became regional Western Australia's second commercial television network on 26 March 1999 after winning the rights tender in 1997. Prior to the launch of the new station, GWN held a commercial monopoly on the market. GWN became an affiliate of the Seven Network, while WIN took a combination of Nine Network and Network Ten programming. Despite Nine's traditional ratings dominance throughout most of the country, incumbent GWN has remained the market's most-watched station. The second ratings survey of 2006 placed WIN Television with a 34.7% commercial audience share in prime-time, compared to the Golden West Network with 65.3%.

Also in 1999, WIN purchased two stations in South Australia, SES-8 in Mount Gambier and RTS-5a in the Riverland region. They became known as WIN SA. In 2002, supplementary licences were granted under Section 38A of the Broadcasting Services Act, allowing the network to launch a WIN Ten service using the MGS call sign in Mount Gambier and LRS in the Riverland. This enabled the main SES/RTS station to be a sole Nine Network affiliate, which lasted until 2007, when a supply agreement was made with Seven.

As well as the flagship weeknightly WIN News bulletin, WIN has been prolific in broadcasting relevant programs for its audience. In the past, it produced current affairs programming including community affairs program Roving Eye, and Sunday Review, a weekly review of international, national and local stories. It produced a mid-week rugby league wrap panel show in the mid-1990s, while in 1995, WIN Television Queensland produced its own rugby league coverage by televising games featuring the fledgling North Queensland Cowboys in their maiden ARL Winfield Cup competition season.

2000–2016: Nine affiliation 

WIN Television began to introduce digital television soon after it became available to metropolitan areas in January 2001. Under Section 38A of the Broadcasting Services Act, the network was able to introduce, in partnership with other stations, additional digital-only Network Ten affiliates. These included Tasmania's TDT, launched in late 2003 in partnership with Southern Cross Broadcasting, and Mildura's MDV in January 2006, with Prime Television Limited.

On 30 May 2007, WIN purchased NWS from Southern Cross Broadcasting for A$105 million. Similarly, STW Perth, owned by Sunraysia Television and affiliated to the Nine Network, was purchased on 8 June 2007 for A$163.1 million.

Despite the station's ownership of Nine Perth, the regional WIN WA service continued to broadcast Ten News Perth, produced for and shown on rival Perth station Ten Perth, until 27 August 2007, when Ten West came into service.

A conflict between WIN and its long-time metropolitan partner, the Nine Network, arose in mid-2007, with PBL Media, Nine's parent company, requesting 40 per cent of the network's advertising revenue in return for program supply. WIN's owner, WIN Corporation rejected this offer, expecting to pay only 29% (a 3% decrease from the previous contract and in line with many of the network's competitors, such as Prime Television and Southern Cross Ten). The network's owner, Bruce Gordon, subsequently threatened to sever the network's affiliation after negotiations stagnated, stating that his previous position at Paramount Pictures meant he could program the network independently. On 16 August 2007, WIN Television dropped key Nine Network programs from its daytime television schedule, including Mornings with Kerri-Anne and National Nine News: Morning Edition. WIN also secured a new program supply agreement for its regional South Australian station with Nine's rival Seven Network. Announced on 4 September 2007, the new program schedule included a mixture of Seven and existing WIN programming, commencing from 1 October 2007. WIN also started producing some local Australian programs to replace key Nine content, including Alive and Cooking and Susie, as well as the independently sourced The Ellen DeGeneres Show. WIN also produced Fishing Australia as part of its local content output on the WIN Network. Two years later, WIN officially reinstated its supply of Nine content to regional South Australia with a new supplementary channel, WIN SA, relaying NWS from Adelaide.

On 9 August 2009, WIN began transmission of the new digital channel GO! on channel 88 in Southern NSW, Regional Victoria, Tasmania and Regional Queensland. It soon reached Mildura in 2010 and regional SA in 2011.

In June 2010, playout was moved from WIN's Wollongong headquarters to its new Media Hub facility in the south-west Sydney suburb of Ingleburn, co-owned with ABC Television.

On 26 September 2010, WIN began transmission of the HD digital channel GEM on channel 80 in Southern NSW, Regional Victoria, Tasmania and Regional Queensland.

On 1 May 2012 WIN began transmission of an SD digital infomercial channel, Gold on channel 84. The second infomercial channel, Gold2 began on 13 July 2013 as a five-hour timeshift of Gold.

Following Nine's launch of 9HD and 9Life on 26 November 2015 and WIN's promise of following suit, WIN began broadcasting a "coming soon" test pattern on channels 85 and 86 on 10 February 2016. Both channels began broadcasting on 1 March 2016.  As a result, their channel listing was reshuffled to match to Nine's metropolitan with 9Gem on channel 82, 9Go! on channel 83, 9Life on channel 84, Extra on channel 85 and Gold on channel 86.

The network has continued to produce its own local news service, WIN News, for most of its markets throughout Nine affiliation, although requests for increased revenue by Nine repeatedly threatened the news division's viability. By 2016, only twelve bulletins were being produced and presented. In most markets, WIN News may compete with Prime7 Local News, Seven News or Nightly News.

2016–2021: 10 affiliation
After Nine launched its new online catch-up video on demand and live streaming service 9Now on 27 January 2016, WIN filed a lawsuit against Nine, claiming that live streaming into regional areas breached their exclusive affiliation agreement. Justice Hammerschlag of the NSW Supreme Court dismissed the case on 28 April 2016, ruling that the definition of "broadcasting" in WIN's affiliation agreement with the Nine Network did not cover internet streaming "and that Nine is under no express or implied obligation not to do it".

Shortly after WIN's legal defeat, Nine announced a new $500 million, five-year program supply agreement with Southern Cross Austereo, the Ten affiliate. This saw Southern Cross Austereo's stations in Southern NSW, the ACT, and regional areas in Victoria and Queensland switch to Nine affiliation at midnight on 1 July 2016. With that announcement, WIN was effectively stripped of its 27-year partnership with Nine. In response, WIN entered affiliation talks with Network Ten, in which Gordon held a significant stake, reaching a final agreement on 23 May 2016. From 1 July 2016, WIN carried Ten programming into its regional Queensland, Southern NSW, Victoria, Tasmania, South Australia and Western Australia markets.  Supplementary station deals were left until late, due to disagreement over the rate that loss-making stations should make to Nine Network. With just days left, deals were secured for South Australia, Griffith and Tasmania. However, no deal was secured for the Western Australia joint-venture West Digital Television before 1 July, but a deal was later finalised on 2 July 2016, with the relay of Nine content commencing that night. According to the channel changes, Ten's channel listing was reshuffled with ONE on channel 81, ELEVEN on channel 82, TVSN on channel 84 and Gold on channel 85.

Negotiations in January 2017 for WIN to acquire Northern New South Wales station NRN in exchange for WIN's Wollongong radio station i98FM with Southern Cross Austereo failed, although a deal was secured on 28 March 2017 for the sole sale of NRN to WIN for $55 million. The sale took effect on 31 May 2017; NRN was rebranded as WIN on 1 September 2017, with playout and transmission transferred to WIN, while the channel numbers were reshuffled to align with WIN's other stations, although they stayed as 5-numbered due to 8-numbering already held by Nine-owned NBN Television for Northern NSW.

On 28 May 2018, WIN announced a new program supply agreement with Australian News Channel to carry Sky News Australia content on a new free-to-air channel, Sky News on WIN, which launched on 2 September 2018. The channel consisted of mixed Sky News and Fox Sports News programming, along with WIN's All Australian News, while Sky programs gained access to WIN's regional news stories.

2021–present: Return to Nine affiliation
On 12 March 2021, Nine announced it had secured a new program supply agreement with its original partner, WIN Network, across regional Australia beginning 1 July 2021, in effect dumping Southern Cross Austereo, which was forced to return to relaying third-placed Ten content. The seven-year deal sees WIN pay around 50 per cent of broadcast advertising revenue to Nine Entertainment Co., plus advertising time for Nine's properties on WIN's television and radio assets. WIN also integrated advertising sales services for Nine's O&O regional stations, NBN and NTD. Nine CEO Hugh Marks explained that "while our relationship with Southern Cross has been strong over the last five years, the opportunities presented by the WIN Network to both extend the reach of Nine's premium content into more regional markets under one agreement, and to work cooperatively with them on a national and local news operation, mean this is the right time for us to return to WIN". Also for the first time, WIN now broadcasts the Nine content under Nine branding. WIN's multi-channels have again been rearranged with 9Gem on channel 81, 9Go! on channel 82 and 9Life on channel 83, while TVSN and Gold would continue to broadcast on channels 84 and 85, but despite the return the "nine dots" were not reinstated on the network logo. WIN still broadcasts Network Ten content on its northern New South Wales station.

In March 2022, WIN Television celebrated 60 years of broadcasting across Wollongong and Illawarra.

The only local programming broadcast by the WIN Network consists of half-hour local WIN News bulletins for its Nine stations in regional Queensland, southern New South Wales, Griffith, regional Victoria and Tasmania, as well as short news updates for its Ten station in northern New South Wales.

Programming
WIN Television carries programming of all three commercial television stations in Australia. It is a sole Nine Network affiliate in all broadcast areas, but also carries Seven Network affiliated channels in Griffith, New South Wales, and eastern South Australia and the Network 10 affiliated channels in Griffith, New South Wales, Northern New South Wales and eastern South Australia. WIN Television has always produced regional programming, including the flagship local news service WIN News, that supplement programs sourced from affiliates.

Since inception, the network has produced and broadcast notable programs including Sportsview and Sportsworld, a review of international, national and local sporting events. From the first week of transmissions, children's television series The Channel 4 Club was produced, with children's television program Stopwatch beginning in 1979. English-language educational programme You Say the Word began in 1971, catering to non-English-speaking immigrants. Long-running entertainment program Variety Italian Style premiered in 1974, with Malcom Elliott initially hosting the short-lived Tonight Show in 1981 being replaced by John Tingle a year later. To commemorate WIN Television's 21st year of broadcasting, a one-and-half-hour retrospective montage special was produced in 1983. WIN Television also co-produced telemovie Last Chance in 1986 with a Canadian television production company. Spanning close to a decade, children's television series Goodsports was produced by WIN Television from 1991 to 2000.

WIN Television's current Australian programming productions consists of television shows including; Fishing Australia and Alive and Cooking. On 17 May 2007, WIN Television announced a new midday program called Susie, however this was subsequently moved to a morning timeslot. It lasted until 2009. WIN Television also broadcast a range of exclusive overseas and domestically sourced programming including The Ellen DeGeneres Show and Alive and Cooking, however since 2021 WIN airs a direct feed from Nine excluding WIN News.

News & Current Affairs

WIN News is the network's local news service. Fourteen regional bulletins and news updates are presented from studios in Wollongong, with reporters and camera crews based in district newsrooms. In most markets, WIN News may compete with Seven News or Nightly News.

WIN has produced independent news reports and bulletins since 1962 for its original Wollongong station. As well as the flagship nightly bulletin, WIN Television has in the past produced current affairs programming including community affairs program Roving Eye, and Sunday Review, a weekly review of international, national and local stories.

WIN also broadcast WIN's All Australian News at 7am and at late nights, that featured highlights from news bulletins from its regional stations that ceased in 2021 due to Nine's new affiliation agreement with WIN.

Sport
On most of the WIN Network's stations, it relays sports coverage broadcast from Nine's Wide World of Sports. On WIN's Northern New South Wales 10 station and other 10 stations in Griffith, Mildura, Regional WA and Eastern SA owned by WIN affiliated with 10, it relays sports coverage provided by 10 Sport. The Seven stations in Griffith, Mount Gambier and the Riverland carry Seven Sport sport coverage.

Availability
WIN Television's transmissions are available from both free-to-air terrestrial transmitters in major regional centres and free-to-view satellite transmissions across regional and remote Western Australia on the Viewer Access Satellite Television service. WIN News bulletins are carried on the VAST service to allow viewers in remote areas of Central and Eastern Australia, as well as terrestrial reception blackspots, to obtain news local to their area.

Subscription cable is also provided by TransACT in the Australian Capital Territory, and Neighbourhood Cable in Ballarat and Mildura.

WIN broadcasts to a geographically large portion of regional and remote Australia, through owned-and-operated stations including RTQ Queensland, NRN Northern New South Wales, WIN Southern New South Wales & ACT, VTV Victoria, TVT Tasmania, MTN Griffith, STV Mildura, SES Mount Gambier, RTS Riverland, and WOW Western Australia.

WIN HD
WIN's high definition channel, WIN HD, originally launched on 17 March 2008 as a sister to the Nine Network's rebranded high definition simulcast, 9HD. WIN HD broadcast in 1080i high definition and was available on WIN's regional stations RTQ Queensland, WIN Southern New South Wales and ACT, VTV Victoria and TVT Tasmania. The channel broadcast breakaway programming from launch until 3 August 2009, when it was turned into a straight HD simulcast. WIN HD fully ceased broadcasting on 26 September 2010 with the launch of the HD multi-channel GEM (now 9Gem).

On 10 February 2016, WIN announced that it would launch its own HD simulcast in the coming months in response to the Nine Network relaunching 9HD as its second high definition channel. WIN HD re-launched on 1 March 2016. Four WIN regions were excluded from the 1 March launch date, although in four regions the launch was delayed - Griffith, Mildura and Eastern South Australia (2 March due to technical issues) and regional Western Australia (10 March). On 1 July 2016, with WIN's new program supply agreement, the channel's program schedule changed in line with WIN. The channel ceased on 30 June 2021 with WIN's new program supply agreement with Nine. WIN now re-broadcasts Nine HD across its Nine stations and 10 HD across northern New South Wales.

Logos

References

External links

 
 Corporate Site

 
Television networks in Australia
English-language television stations in Australia
Television channels and stations established in 1962